Jeong Yeo-rip (korean:정여립; hanja:鄭汝立, 1546 - 1589) was a Korean politician of the Joseon period. His pen name was Jukdo, and his courtesy name name was Inbaek.

Popular culture
 Portrayed by Ahn Nae-sang in the 2004-2005 KBS1 TV series Immortal Admiral Yi Sun-sin.
 Portrayed by Choi Cheol-ho in the 2014 KBS2 TV series The King's Face.

References 
 Jeong Yeo-rip 
 정여립의 난-역모인가 조작인가 KBS 역사스페셜 2002년 5월 25일자 방송분 
 EBS 수능방송 파문 '정여립' 모반인가 음해인가:무려 1천여명 황천길…역모 결정적 근거 제시 못해 브레이크뉴스 2004년 8월 31일자 뉴스 

1546 births
1589 deaths
Korean admirals
Korean generals
Military history of Korea
16th-century Korean people
Korean military personnel killed in action